French Quarter is a 1978 American drama film directed by Dennis Kane, and telling two parallel stories set in the red light area of New Orleans, one contemporary and one set at the turn of the century. The film has music composed by Dick Hyman.

The film stars Virginia Mayo, Bruce Davison, Alisha Fontaine, Ann Michelle and Lindsay Bloom in the lead roles, with Lance LeGault appearing uncredited.

Cast
 Virginia Mayo as Countess Willie Piazza / Ida
 Bruce Davison as Kid Ross / Inspector Sordik
 Alisha Fontaine as Trudy Dix / Christine Delaplane
  Ann Michelle as Coke-Eyed Laura / Policewoman in French Hotel
 Lindsay Bloom as Big Butt Annie / Policewoman in Bar
 Vernel Bagneris as Jelly Roll / Policeman
 Anna Filamento as Madame Papaloos / Madame Beaudine
 Lance LeGault as Tom / Burt

References

External links
 
 

1978 films
1978 drama films
Films shot in Louisiana
American drama films
Films set in New Orleans
1970s English-language films
1970s American films